Ana María del Carmen Ribeiro Gutiérrez (born 22 October 1955), known as Ana Ribeiro, is a Uruguayan historian, writer, and professor. Her works are based on essays and novels that relate historical events of the country.

Biography
Ana Ribeiro was born in Montevideo on 22 October 1955. In 2008, she earned her diploma of advanced studies (DEA) in the doctorate of "Foundations of Historical Research" at the University of Salamanca. Her thesis, on royalist resistance on the Asunción-Montevideo axis during the wars of independence, first published in 2013 with the title Los Muy Fieles. Leales a la corona en el proceso revolucionario rioplatense. Montevideo-Asunción 1810–1820, won the Premio Extraordinario from the University of Salamanca for best thesis of the year.

Ribeiro has been teaching since 1988, mostly at the Catholic University of Uruguay. At that school she has taught the courses "Historiographic Currents", "National Historiographic Workshop" (of which she is also director), "20th Century Historiography", "Main Currents of Thought in the West", "Theories of Communication IV", and "Social Theory III", which she has been in charge of since 2007.

In 1999, Ribeiro participated as a juror on the Teledoce television series Martini y Antel preguntan. From 2000 to 2001 she did the same on Channel 10's evening magazine Caleidoscopio, for its segment dedicated to history. In 2004, she was a panelist on Teledoce's Agenda Confidencial, hosted by Néber Araújo.

Ribeiro has specialized in the history of national hero José Gervasio Artigas, and published Los Tiempos de Artigas in six volumes through El Paíss publishing house in 1999. She later made an exhaustive investigation in Paraguayan archives about his life in that country (from 1820 until his death in 1850). This led her to deepen her interest in the Supreme Dictator José Gaspar Rodríguez de Francia, who gave him political asylum. This material was reflected in her work El Caudillo y el Dictador (Planeta, 2004). The first of the two volumes of Los muy fieles is dedicated to the Spanish people of Asunción, and the second to those of Montevideo, given her great knowledge of both countries in the 19th century.

Politics

In the 2014 general election, Ribeiro took sixth place on the list of candidates for the Senate.

Awards and honors
 1990 – First Prize of the National Academy of Letters in the contest on "Currents of Contemporary Uruguayan Historiography (1940-1990)"
 1992 – First Prize of the National Academy of Letters in the contest on "Currents of Uruguayan Historiography (1880-1940)"
 1996 – First Prize of the National Academy of Letters in the contest on "Historians and chroniclers of Montevideo"
 1998 – First Prize of the contest of essays organized by the newspaper El País on the "One Hundred Years of the Revolution of 1897"
 2000 – "Woman of the Year" Award in the Literary category
 2001 – Bartolomé Hidalgo Award, Revelation category, granted by the 
 2003 – "Woman of the Year" Award in the Literary category
 2004 – Bartolomé Hidalgo Award, granted by the Uruguayan Book Chamber, in the non-fiction category, for El Caudillo y el Dictador
 2004 – 2nd Prize of the Ministry of Education and Culture for the historical essay El Caudillo y el Dictador
 2004 – Julio Sosa Prize, awarded by the municipality of Canelones
 2004 – Dragon of San Fernando Prize, awarded by the Municipality of Maldonado
 2005 – Silver  (career) in "Historical Research", given by the Lolita Rubial Foundation "for her contribution to culture, art, and science"
 2014 – Bartolomé Hidalgo Award, granted by the Book Chamber of Uruguay, in the historical essay category, for Los Muy Fieles. Leales a la corona en el proceso revolucionario rioplatense. Montevideo-Asunción 1810–1820
 2014 – Premio Extraordinario from the University of Salamanca, Spain, for her thesis on royalist resistance in Asunción and Montevideo during the wars of independence

References

1955 births
20th-century Uruguayan women writers
21st-century Uruguayan women writers
Living people
Academic staff of the Catholic University of Uruguay
University of Salamanca alumni
University of the Republic (Uruguay) alumni
20th-century Uruguayan historians
Uruguayan novelists
Uruguayan women essayists
Uruguayan women novelists
Women historians
National Party (Uruguay) politicians
21st-century Uruguayan historians